"Thoughtless" is a song written by American nu metal band Korn for their fifth studio album, Untouchables. "Thoughtless" was released as the album's second single in July 2002. The single charted at 11 on the US Alternative chart, and at 37 on the UK main chart.

Background
Jonathan Davis, the vocalist of Korn, said that "Thoughtless" is "a song about people who are constantly ridiculed and the collateral damage it can cause".

Live performance
This song was introduced to fans during a live show at the Hammerstein Ballroom, in New York City on June 10, 2002, which celebrated the release of Untouchables. This performance appears on the DVD release entitled Live. "Thoughtless" has been played during the Untouchables promotional tour, in 2002, but it was scrapped  from the band's setlist one year later. It eventually returned in 2006 on the See You on the Other Side World Tour as a part of a medley. The full song was played at the 2006 Family Values Tour and the Escape from the Studio Tour. It has most recently been performed as part of their Korn: Monumental live stream.

Music video
In the beginning, a high-school aged boy (who is revealed to be called Floyd Louis Cifer in a yearbook, and whose first name was the working title of "Thoughtless" on the unmastered, leaked version of Untouchables),  portrayed by Aaron Paul (who was 22 at the time), is walking through the hallways of his school. Four girls are teasing and looking at him in disgust. A group of jocks on the other side of the hallway attack and give him dirty looks. In the next scene, Floyd is in his science class drawing strange pictures in his notebook. Song titles from Untouchables can also be seen. He then goes to the pool to swim. However, the jocks find Floyd there and attempt to drown him. After that, he is in the locker room wrapped in a towel and is seen increasingly agitated. We then see Floyd in his room looking at a yearbook. He throws the yearbook at his window and looks in the phonebook for a service which says "Fantasy Escorts." He calls the service and shows up at his prom with a woman (portrayed by Aimee Sweet from Penthouse Pets). He vomits on everyone who has bullied him and gets his revenge. Korn performs inside his mind throughout the video. Jonathan Davis appears on his back in one scene.
There is another version of the video known as the "performance version",  that only shows Korn performing the song in the room featured in the original music video.

Reception
Rolling Stone was a little average about the song, saying: "On the single “Thoughtless,” Jonathan Davis sings a line that even today leaps out as an extraordinarily forbidden sentiment: “I wanna kill and rape you the way you raped me.” Does he literally mean this? (Davis has gone on record as a survivor of childhood sexual abuse.) Or is it a metaphor for his feelings about the music biz? Either way, the song has a tremendous topical power that’s bound to be contemplated or misunderstood. Korn rarely identify the “you” they’re constantly battling." The New York Times said that the song had "vindictiveness". NME was very positive about the song: "Davis stops giving into melodrama and remembers that he has a lot to be extremely angry about. [...] 'Thoughtless' marries the taut grooves of Fugazi with a refrain of 'why are you trying to make fun of me?'"

Evanescence cover

The song was covered by Evanescence on tour and for their 2004 live album and concert DVD Anywhere but Home, featuring a piano arrangement by lead singer Amy Lee.

Track listing
Enhanced maxi CD single
 "Thoughtless" – 4:32
 "Thoughtless (D Cooley Remix featuring DJ Z-Trip)" – 3:52
 "Thoughtless (Dante Ross Remix)" – 4:21
 "Here to Stay (Tone Toven and Sleep Remix)" – 3:28
 "Here to Stay (Remixed by Mindless Self Indulgence)" – 3:45
 "Thoughtless" (video) – 4:32

DVD single
 "Thoughtless" (video) - 4:32

Charts

Weekly charts

Year-end charts

References

External links

Korn songs
2002 singles
2002 songs
Songs about bullying
Songs written by Reginald Arvizu
Songs written by Jonathan Davis
Songs written by James Shaffer
Songs written by David Silveria
Songs written by Brian Welch
Song recordings produced by Michael Beinhorn